Tricholoma inamoenum is a mushroom of the agaric genus Tricholoma found through the Northern Hemisphere, particularly under conifers. It is poisonous, and is characterized by an unpleasant odor resembling coal gas or tar.

Seattle's Tricholoma platyphyllum may be the same species. A similar species is Tricholoma sulphureum, which is found under both conifers and hardwoods.

See also
List of North American Tricholoma
List of Tricholoma species

References

inamoenum
Fungi described in 1815
Fungi of North America
Inedible fungi
Taxa named by Elias Magnus Fries